"Embrace, extend, and extinguish" (EEE), also known as "embrace, extend, and exterminate", is a phrase that the U.S. Department of Justice found that was used internally by Microsoft to describe its strategy for entering product categories involving widely used standards, extending those standards with proprietary capabilities, and then using those differences in order to strongly disadvantage its competitors.

The phrase is no longer used by Microsoft, or describes its current position toward Linux or open source generally. Microsoft has "changed since the days of branding Linux a cancer" and is currently the largest contributing firm to open-source projects.

Origin
The strategy and phrase "embrace and extend" were first described outside Microsoft in a 1996 article in The New York Times titled "Tomorrow, the World Wide Web! Microsoft, the PC King, Wants to Reign Over the Internet", in which writer John Markoff said, "Rather than merely embrace and extend the Internet, the company's critics now fear, Microsoft intends to engulf it." The phrase "embrace and extend" also appears in a facetious motivational song by an anonymous Microsoft employee, and in an interview of Steve Ballmer by The New York Times.

A variant of the phrase, "embrace, extend then innovate", is used in J Allard's 1994 memo "Windows: The Next Killer Application on the Internet" to Paul Maritz and other executives at Microsoft. The memo starts with a background on the Internet in general, and then proposes a strategy on how to turn Windows into the next "killer app" for the Internet:

The addition of "extinguish" in the phrase "embrace, extend and extinguish" was first introduced in the United States v. Microsoft Corp. antitrust trial when then vice president of Intel, Steven McGeady, used the phrase to explain Microsoft vice president Paul Maritz's statement in a 1995 meeting with Intel that described Microsoft's strategy to "kill HTML by extending it".

Strategy 
The strategy's three phases are:
 Embrace: Development of software substantially compatible with a competing product, or implementing a public standard.
 Extend: Addition and promotion of features not supported by the competing product or part of the standard, creating interoperability problems for customers who try to use the "simple" standard.
 Extinguish: When extensions become a de facto standard because of their dominant market share, they marginalize competitors that do not or cannot support the new extensions.

Microsoft has claimed that the original strategy is not anti-competitive, but rather an exercise of its discretion to implement features it believes customers want.

Examples by Microsoft 
 Browser incompatibilities: 
 The plaintiffs in an antitrust case claimed that Microsoft had added support for ActiveX controls in the Internet Explorer Web browser to break compatibility with Netscape Navigator, which used components based on Java and Netscape's own plugin system. 
 On CSS, data:, etc.: A decade after the original Netscape-related antitrust suit, the Web browser company Opera Software filed an antitrust complaint against Microsoft with the  European Union, saying it "calls on Microsoft to adhere to its own public pronouncements to support these standards, instead of stifling them with its notorious 'Embrace, Extend and Extinguish' strategy".
 Office documents: In a memo to the Office product group in 1998, Bill Gates stated: "One thing we have got to change in our strategy – allowing Office documents to be rendered very well by other people's browsers is one of the most destructive things we could do to the company. We have to stop putting any effort into this and make sure that Office documents very well depends on PROPRIETARY IE capabilities. Anything else is suicide for our platform. This is a case where Office has to avoid doing something to destory Windows."
 Breaking Java's portability: The antitrust case's plaintiffs also accused Microsoft of using an "embrace and extend" strategy with regard to the Java platform, which was designed explicitly with the goal of developing programs that could run on any operating system, be it Windows, Mac, or Linux.  They claimed that, by omitting the Java Native Interface (JNI) from its implementation and providing J/Direct for a similar purpose, Microsoft deliberately tied Windows Java programs to its platform, making them unusable on Linux and Mac systems. According to an internal communication, Microsoft sought to downplay Java's cross-platform capability and make it "just the latest, best way to write Windows applications". Microsoft paid Sun US$20 million in January 2001 (equivalent to $ million in ) to settle the resulting legal implications of their breach of contract.
 More Java issues: Sun sued Microsoft over Java again in 2002 and Microsoft agreed to settle out of court for US$2 billion (equivalent to US$ billion in ).
 Instant messaging: In 2001, CNET described an instance concerning Microsoft's instant messaging program. "Embrace" AOL's IM protocol, the de facto standard of the 1990s and early 2000s. "Extend" the standard with proprietary Microsoft addons which added new features, but broke compatibility with AOL's software. Gain dominance, since Microsoft had 95% OS share and their MSN Messenger was provided for free. Finally, "extinguish" and lock out AOL's IM software, since AOL was unable to use the modified MS-patented protocol. 
 Email protocols: Microsoft supported POP3, IMAP, and SMTP email protocols in their Microsoft Outlook email client. At the same time, they developed their own email protocol, MAPI, which has since been documented but is largely unused by third parties. Microsoft has announced that they would end support for basic authentication access to Exchange Online APIs for Office 365 customers, which disables most use of IMAP or POP3 and requires significant upgrades to applications in order to continue to use those protocols; some customers have responded by simply shutting off older protocols.
 Unix/Linux: Microsoft included a bare-minimum POSIX layer from the beginning of NT, later replaced with Windows Services for UNIX, a more full-featured UNIX based on Interix with various unique features that were not portable to other Unix-like operating systems. Windows Subsystem for Linux replaced it in 2018, and the current WSL2 has moved away from reimplementing Linux to virtualizing an actual Linux kernel and allowing full distribution installations, beginning with Ubuntu.

Web browsers

Netscape
During the browser wars, Netscape implemented the "font" tag, among other HTML extensions, without seeking review from a standards body. With the rise of Internet Explorer, the two companies became locked in a dead heat to out-implement each other with non-standards-compliant features. In 2004, to prevent a repeat of the "browser wars", and the resulting morass of conflicting standards, the browser vendors Apple Inc. (Safari), Mozilla Foundation (Firefox), and Opera Software (Opera browser) formed the Web Hypertext Application Technology Working Group (WHATWG) to create open standards to complement those of the World Wide Web Consortium. Microsoft refused to join, citing the group's lack of a patent policy as the reason.

Google Chrome
With its dominance in the web browser market, Google has been accused of using Google Chrome and Blink development to push new web standards that are proposed in-house by Google and subsequently implemented by its services first and foremost. These have led to performance disadvantages and compatibility issues with competing browsers, and in some cases, developers intentionally refusing to test their websites on any other browser than Chrome. Tom Warren of The Verge went as far as comparing Chrome to Internet Explorer 6, the default browser of Windows XP that was often targeted by competitors due to its similar ubiquity in the early 2000s.

See also

 Criticism of Microsoft
 Halloween documents
 Microsoft and open source
 Network effect
 Path dependence
 Vendor lock-in
 32-bit vs 64-bit
 AARD code

References

External links

Report on Microsoft documents relating to Office and IE Embrace, extend and extinguish

Microsoft criticisms and controversies
Interoperability
Marketing techniques